Croatia selected its entry for the 1994 Eurovision Song Contest through the "Dora 1994" contest, which was held on 20 March 1994, organised by the Croatian national broadcaster Hrvatska radiotelevizija (HRT) in Opatija. The winner was Tony Cetinski with "Nek' ti bude ljubav sva".

Before Eurovision

Dora 1994 
HRT organised the Dora contest to select the Croatian entry to the Eurovision Song Contest 1994, held in Dublin, Ireland, on 30 April 1994. This was the 2nd edition of Dora, held in Opatija. The national contest consisted of a televised final with 21 songs held on 20 March 1994 selected from a public call for submissions from songwriters and composers. The winner was chosen by the votes of 11 regional juries.

At Eurovision
Tony Cetinski competed for Croatia the Eurovision contest on 30 April 1994 in Dublin, and finished 16th out of 25 countries, with 27 votes.

Voting

References

External links
Dora 1994 at the Eurofest Croatia website 

1994
Countries in the Eurovision Song Contest 1994
Eurovision